Mary Kenner (7 Dec 1933 – 28 October 2017) was a Canadian figure skater. She competed in the 1953 World Figure Skating Championships.

References

1933 births
2017 deaths
Canadian female single skaters